William Courtenay, 8th Earl de jure of Devon (30 October 1742 – 14 October 1788) was the eldest son of William Courtenay 7th de jure Earl of Devon, and Lady Frances Finch.

He succeeded to the title of 4th Baronet Courtenay, 2nd Viscount Courtenay of Powderham Castle and 8th Earl of Devon (Created c.1553) on 16 May 1762 upon the death of his father.

Family 

He married Lady Frances Clack (d. 25 March 1782) on (7 May 1762) with whom he had the following children.

 Frances Courtenay (b. January 1763) married Sir John Honywood, 4th Baronet on 13 June 1788.
 Charlotte Courtenay (b. 14 February 1764) married Thomas Giffard.
 Isabella Courtenay (20 June 1765 – 5 March 1783) died when her clothes caught fire
 Elizabeth Courtenay (2 September 1766 – 11 September 1815) married Lord Charles Henry Somerset in June 1788.
 William Courtenay, 9th Earl of Devon (30 July 1768 – 26 May 1835)
 Lucy Courtenay (13 June 1770 – 27 January 1822) married John Vaughan, 3rd Earl of Lisburne on 2 August 1798.
 Harriet Courtenay (7 September 1771 – 14 April 1826) married George Thynne, 2nd Baron Carteret on 9 May 1797.
 Anne Courtenay (2 July 1774 – 6 January 1835) married George Annesley, 2nd Earl of Mountnorris on 3 September 1790.
 Caroline-Eustatia Courtenay (b. 26 March 1775) married Colonel Charles Morland on 14 June 1812.
 Matilda-Jane Courtenay (b. 6 July 1778) married John Lock.
 Sophia Courtenay (b. 25 January 1780) married Lieutenant-Colonel Nathaniel Foy in December 1804.
 Louisa Augusta Courtenay (d. 8 February 1825) married Lord Edward Somerset on 17 October 1805.

And one illegitimate child. The mother of this child is unknown, all that is known is the child had the surname "Vane" and she was "akin" to Sir Henry Vane the Younger who died of beheading in 1662 over one hundred years earlier].

 Mary Ann Vane (26 February 1784 – c. 1848–1852) married Louis Chevalier, Seigneur du Saint-Paul of Quebec in approximately 1799. They had three children, Mary Sophia Chevalier, Philip David Chevalier and Mary Anne Chevalier.

1742 births
1788 deaths
Earls of Devon (1553 creation)